The Massachusetts Right to Repair Initiative (2020), also known as Question 1, appeared on the Massachusetts 2020 general election ballot as an initiated state statute. It was approved by voters and the measure will update the state's right to repair laws to include electronic vehicle data. A similar Right to repair initiative (also named Question 1) appeared on the 2012 state ballot and passed with 86% of the vote.

Summary 

The measure extends the state's right to repair laws to include telematics systems. Telematics systems contain car data that is stored outside the vehicle, and may include information that relates to navigation, GPS, and mobile internet. The measure will require cars sold in Massachusetts starting with the model year 2022 to equip any cars having telematics systems with a standardized open access data platform. Independent repair shops and mechanics would, with owner permission, automatically have access to the vehicle's data to use it for diagnostics and car repair. Currently this data may only be used by manufacturer repair shops unless permission is granted.

Proponents

Supporting arguments 
Supporters of the initiative argue that it would extend consumer choice in car repair sites, increasing competition and decreasing costs of car repair. Independent mechanic advocates argue that it would help support smaller and more local repair shops to be able to compete with larger manufacturer repair chains. Telematics is also a growing part of car systems, and supporters of the initiative argue it would extend right to repair to account for technological changes.  Opponents say this is a misleading characterization of the auto repair market, in which owners would still have choices for finding fixes.

The proposal requires that access to information would pass through "an authorization process standardized across all makes and models and administered by an entity unaffiliated with the manufacturer."  Opponents of the measure have not identified any basis to believe that this entity will not take advantage of data security techniques in designing the authorization process or to believe that data protection measures will be insufficient to protect the data and vehicle owner.

Opponents 
Opponents of the initiative argue that it would result in cyber security risk and possibly make vehicle data more vulnerable. Several TV ads attacking the initiative have connected the data security concerns as allowing easier stalking and concerns of sexual predators. Critics have cited these concerns as "[veering] into exaggeration and fear mongering".

Polling

Results

See also 

 Massachusetts Right to Repair Initiative (2012)
 Massachusetts Ranked-Choice Voting Initiative (2020)
 Direct Democracy in Massachusetts

References

Further reading

External links

2020 Massachusetts ballot measures
Election legislation
Right to Repair